Hierodryas is a genus of moths of the family Yponomeutidae.

Species
Hierodryas eriochiras - Meyrick, 1931 

Yponomeutidae